Cascade High School is a secondary school located in Everett, Washington, United States. Part of the Everett Public Schools, it caters to grades 9–12 and has an annual enrollment of approximately 1,933 students. Students attending Cascade High School live primarily within the city of Everett, but some live in Mill Creek, Snohomish, and Mukilteo. The Cascade mascot is the Bruin and the school's colors are crimson and grey.

History
Prior to the construction of Cascade High School, all secondary students within the Everett School District attended Everett High School in downtown Everett from its opening in 1880. As the neighboring Mukilteo School District lacked a high school during that period, students from that district attended Everett High as well. One high school was sufficient for Everett between its incorporation and the end of World War II in 1945 since it had no annexation of any kind during that period.

However, the post-World War II baby boom and suburban expansion south of Everett brought unprecedented population growth for the city; four new and three replacement schools opened between 1947 and 1957 to keep up with the increased demand, with future feeder Evergreen Junior High School opening in 1958. The rapid expansion drove demand for a new high school in that area, further compounded by Boeing's plans to build a new factory there for its first wide-body aircraft, the 747. Originally projected to open for the 1960–61 school year, construction delays pushed Cascade's opening back an additional year; when it finally opened on September 5, 1961, for the 1961–62 school year, the campus initially had seven buildings built at $3 million total and $16 per square foot. While initially located in unincorporated Snohomish County, Everett annexed Cascade and its surrounding area on February 6, 1962.

Cascade underwent renovation and modernization in 1999. Everett-based Dykeman Architects & Interiors was the lead architect on the project, with Redmond-based Osborne Construction serving as general contractor.

Free Stehekin controversy
In 2007, Cascade was embroiled in controversy when district superintendent Carol Whitehead fired English and journalism teacher Kay Grant Powers over a dispute on the district-unauthorized publication of the Free Stehekin, an underground paper published by Cascade students with the help of Powers. Powers, an unabashed leftist and ardent free speech supporter who had taught at Cascade since 1984, was accused by Whitehead of using school equipment to print the paper, damaging the reputation of the district in the process. The dispute was related to a 2005 lawsuit filed by two Everett High students who were co-editors of the Kodak, the school's newspaper; the lawsuit, settled by the former editors and the district in August 2007, was filed over the ability of school administrators to review the newspaper before publication. In the meantime, the district's enforcement of prior review policies forced the Kodak and the Free Stehekin underground as well as the Tyro, the literary magazine of Cascade.

While Powers had emailed Whitehead in February 2007, agreeing to not use school equipment for the Free Stehekin, Powers admitted that some use had occurred. It was later revealed that on May 10, a hidden camera was installed in Powers' classroom by a vendor under request of the district, whose officials denied its existence for four months until evidence was shown to the contrary. The teachers' union agreed to dispute Powers' firing, with a public hearing scheduled for mid-April 2008; however, Powers and Whitehead agreed to a settlement on April 11. Under the settlement, Powers was reinstated with back pay as an English teacher for Henry M. Jackson High School before retiring in August 2009. Meanwhile, Whitehead retired on August 31, 2008, partly over her family's concerns about a mailed death threat she received at district headquarters in late April of that year. Powers ultimately died at her Seattle residence on January 4, 2019; she was 76 years old and suffering from dementia.

Craig Verver sexual abuse controversy

In 2016 and 2017, the Everett School District and Cascade High School teacher Craig Verver were named as defendants in lawsuits by two former students, accusing Craig Verver of grooming and sexual abuse of students, and accusing the school district of negligently failing to act to protect students from his abuse.  The Everett School District kept Craig Verver employed on paid leave even after he admitted in deposition to having sex with one of the students in his classroom.  Instead of firing the disgraced teacher, the Everett School District instead allowed Craig Verver to simply quietly resign his position, effective June 2018.  He voluntarily surrendered his teaching certificate to the Washington Office of the Superintendent of Public Instruction in January 2019.

Academics

The school offers Advanced Placement programs in subjects such as history, science, art, mathematics, and English.

Athletics
Cascade High School is part of District One of the Washington Interscholastic Activities Association (WIAA). Cascade was a longtime member of Wesco 4A, but dropped down to 3A in 2020 due to WIAA guideline changes; its adjusted enrollment had dropped to the 3A level in 2016, but Cascade elected to remain in 4A up to that point. Cascade offers sports including men's baseball, basketball, football, soccer, tennis, track and field, cross-country, golf, wrestling, and swimming.  Women's sports offerings include tennis, basketball, volleyball, soccer, fast-pitch softball, cross-country, track and field, swimming, wrestling, golf, and bowling.

Notable alumni
 Ryan G. Anderson, convicted terrorist
 Gary Bryan, radio personality
 Patrick Duffy, actor, starring in such series as Dallas, Man from Atlantis and Step By Step
 Chris Henderson, soccer player for the US national team
 Mark Hodgins, former member of the Alaska House of Representatives
 Geoff Reece, NFL center
 Marc Schneider, Olympic rower who competed at the 1996 and 2000 Summer Olympics.
 Grady Sizemore, former MLB player 
 Steven Souza Jr., former MLB player

Notes

References

External links
 

Education in Everett, Washington
High schools in Snohomish County, Washington
Public high schools in Washington (state)